Michigan's 4th Senate district is one of 38 districts in the Michigan Senate. It has been represented by Democrat Darrin Camilleri since 2023, succeeding fellow Democrat Marshall Bullock.

Geography
District 4 encompasses part of Wayne County.

2011 Apportionment Plan
District 4, as dictated by the 2011 Apportionment Plan, was based in central Detroit in Wayne County, also covering the nearby communities of Allen Park, Lincoln Park, and Southgate.

The district was split three ways among Michigan's 12th, 13th, and 14th congressional districts, and overlapped with the 3rd, 4th, 5th, 6th, 7th, 10th, 13th, and 14th districts of the Michigan House of Representatives. At just over 47 square miles, it was the smallest Senate district in the state.

Recent election results

2018

2016 special election
In March 2016, incumbent Virgil Smith Jr. resigned after being sentenced to prison for shooting up his wife's car, and a special election was called to fill the seat.

2014

Federal and statewide results in District 4

Historical district boundaries

References 

4
Wayne County, Michigan